Sawpit Canyon is a steep valley or canyon in the San Bernardino Mountains of San Bernardino County, California. Its creek was a tributary of the West Fork Mojave River, its original mouth now under Silverwood Lake.

History
Sawpit Canyon was part of the route of the Mohave Trail, taken by the Native American traders from the Colorado River and beyond in the southwest to the Pacific Ocean. In 1776, Father Francisco Garcés became the first known explorer to travel on this route and leave a written record of his experiences.  Jedediah Smith, in 1826, was the first known Anglo-American to use the Mohave Trail.

References

Valleys of San Bernardino County, California
Mohave Trail